Cilea or CILEA may refer to: 

 Consorzio Interuniversitario Lombardo per l'Elaborazione Automatica, academic consortium in Italy
 Francesco Cilea (1866–1950), Italian composer